Glenside is a village in the Canadian province of Saskatchewan within the Rural Municipality of Rudy No. 284 and Census Division No. 11. The village is located on Highway 219 approximately 10 km east of the Town of Outlook.

History 
Glenside incorporated as a village on March 30, 1911.

Demographics 

See also

 List of communities in Saskatchewan
 Villages of Saskatchewan

References

Villages in Saskatchewan
Rudy No. 284, Saskatchewan
Division No. 11, Saskatchewan